The 2014 AFL draft consists of the various periods where the 18 clubs in the Australian Football League (AFL) can trade and recruit players following the completion of the 2014 AFL season.  Additions to each club's playing list are not allowed at any other time during the year. This was the last year in which any team passed on a selection in the national draft.

The key dates for the trading and drafting periods are:
The free agency offer period between 3 October and 13 October.  Three further free agency periods are held for delisted players, between 1 November and 12 November, 14 November to 19 November and 28 November to 1 December.
Father-son and academy players were nominated by 3 October, with a bidding process held on 6 October.
The trade period; which was held between 6 October and 16 October
The 2014 national draft; which was conducted on 27 November 2014 at the Gold Coast Convention Centre.
The 2015 pre-season draft which was held on 3 December 2014 and
The 2015 rookie draft, also held on 3 December 2014.
Final club lists for the 2015 AFL season were lodged to the AFL on 5 December 2014.

The 2014 draft was the best draft from a NSW/ACT perspective in recent history, as there were as many as seven players recruited from the region. Isaac Heeney was taken at pick 18, followed by Jack Hiscox, Abe Davis, Jack Steele, Dougal Howard, Logan Austin and Jeremy Finlayson. This total of seven new recruits (Dan Robinson was a rookie upgrade) was just one player less than what was recruited from the traditional football state of Western Australia.

Player movements

Free agency

The initial list of free agents, published in March 2014, consisted of 48 unrestricted free agents and nine restricted free agents.  The mid-year revision in July listed 27 unrestricted free agents and only two restricted free agents, due to players re-signing with their existing clubs or announcing their retirement.
	
The final free agents list issued on 29 September, the week before the trade period commenced, consisted of 13 unrestricted free agents and only Shaun Higgins on the restricted free agent list, reflecting that most of the original list had either re-signed with their current club or retired from the AFL. James Frawley, Jarrad Waite, Dustin Fletcher, Brad Sewell, Luke McPharlin, Adam Goodes and Nick Malceski were the highest profile players remaining on the list.

Trades
The AFL trade period will run from Monday 6 October until Thursday 16 October.  The AFL announced that it was shortening the trade period by one day from the usual Friday deadline due to Etihad Stadium, which is used by the AFL clubs during the trade period, being booked on the Friday for the International Convention of Jehovah's Witnesses.

On 9 October it was revealed that the AFL had banned the Sydney Swans from recruiting players, either by trading or through free agency signing, for the next two trading periods (until the end of the 2016 season), unless the club was prepared to give up its cost of living allowance (COLA), the allowance above the base salary cap which the club is permitted to pay its players to reflect the higher cost of living in Sydney compared with Melbourne. Sydney opted to abide by the restrictions in order to retain its COLA, and recruited no players. The club was not restricted from receiving draft picks in exchange for players leaving the club.

Note: The numbering of the draft picks in this list may be different to the agreed draft picks at the time of the trade, due to adjustments from either the insertion of free agency compensation draft picks or clubs exiting the draft before later rounds.

Retirements and delistings

2014 national draft
The 2014 AFL national draft was held on 27 November 2014 at the Gold Coast Convention Centre.
Final draft order

 Notes
 Compensation picks are selections in addition to the normal order of selection, allocated to clubs by the AFL as compensation for losing uncontracted players to the new expansion clubs, Gold Coast and Greater Western Sydney.  The picks can be held for up to five years and clubs declare at the beginning of the season of their intent to utilise the pick at the end of the season.  Picks could be traded to other clubs in return for players or other draft selections.
 Free agency compensation picks are additional selections awarded to teams based on their net loss of players during the free agency trade period.
 Academy players are local zone selections available to the four NSW and Queensland clubs.  Both Academy and Father-son selections are subject to a bidding process, where the club with the family or academy connection must match any opposition club's bid with their next available selection.

Rookie elevations
Between 2009 and 2013, rookie listed players that were elevated to their club's senior list were listed in the national draft order at the end of the club's selections.  In 2014 the AFL reverted to the system used in 2008 and earlier, where they are not included in the draft list.  Club can retain a rookie for up to three years before they must be elevated to the senior list or delisted.    The 22 players elevated in 2014 are provided below.

2015 pre-season draft
The 2015 AFL pre-season draft was held on 3 December 2014.  Only five clubs could have taken part, with the other clubs completing their lists during the National Draft, however Carlton made the only selection, with all other clubs passing.

2015 rookie draft
The 2015 AFL rookie draft was held on 3 December 2014. The official rookie draft order was released on 2 December and each club, with the exception of Greater Western Sydney who are still operating with an expanded list, can have between 4 and 6 players on their rookie list, as long as they have a maximum of 44 players on their combined primary and rookie lists.

Selections by league

References 

Australian Football League draft
Draft
AFL Draft
AFL Draft
2010s in Queensland
Australian rules football in Queensland
Sport on the Gold Coast, Queensland
Events in Queensland